Newpoint Schools are located in Florida and include:

Newpoint Bay High (9-12)
Newpoint Pinellas High (9-12)
Newpoint Pensacola High (9-12)
Newpoint Bay Academy (6-8)
Newpoint Pensacola Academy (6-8)

The schools use individualized learning and project based learning methods.

Schools
Newpoint Bay High School is a high school located in Panama City, Florida at 2381 St Andrews Blvd, It uses the Apex Learning online curriculum. The school is part of Newpoint Schools.

External links
Newpoint Bay Academy and High School website
Newpoint Pensacola Academy and High School website
Newpoint Pinellas Academy and High School website

Charter schools in Florida